Bifidocoelotes is a genus of East Asian funnel weavers first described by X. P. Wang in 2002.

Species 
 it contains six species:

 Bifidocoelotes elongatus Liao, Wang, Yin & Xu, 2022 — China
 Bifidocoelotes mammiformis Liao, Wang, Yin & Xu, 2022 — China
 Bifidocoelotes obscurus Zhou, Yuen & Zhang, 2017 — Hong Kong
 Bifidocoelotes primus (Fox, 1937) — Hong Kong
 Bifidocoelotes quadratus Liao, Wang, Yin & Xu, 2022 — China
 Bifidocoelotes tsoi Li & Blick, 2020 — Taiwan

References

External links

Agelenidae
Araneomorphae genera
Spiders of China